Eushelfordia is a genus of cockroaches from the family Ectobiidae.

Description

Etymology

Taxonomy
Eushelfordia contains the following species:
 Eushelfordia amazonensis
 Eushelfordia pica

References

Cockroach genera